"Eastside LB" is the second single released by the Twinz from their debut album, Conversation. Warren G, who produced the song, was featured on "Eastside LB" along with R&B singer Tracey Nelson. The song was a minor hit on the R&B and rap charts.

Single track listing
"Eastside LB" (LP Version)- 3:38  
"Eastside LB" (Instrumental)- 3:38  
"Jump ta This" (LP Version)- 2:53

Charts

References

1996 singles
Twinz songs
1996 songs
Def Jam Recordings singles
Music videos directed by Paul Hunter (director)